Désiré Piryns (1889 – 23 April 1948) was a Belgian painter. His work was part of the painting event in the art competition at the 1936 Summer Olympics.

References

1889 births
1948 deaths
20th-century Belgian painters
Belgian painters
Olympic competitors in art competitions
People from Zele